Several left-wing guerrilla groups attempting to overthrown the pro-Western regime of Shah Mohammad Reza Pahlavi were notable and active in Iran from 1971 to 1979. The groups shared a commitment to armed struggle, but differed in ideology. Most were Marxist in orientation, but the largest group — People's Mujahedin of Iran — was founded as an Islamic socialist organization. The left-wing movement is meant to overthrow conservative or capitalist systems and replace them with Marxist–Leninist, socialist, or anarchist societies.

While the guerrilla movement did not lead the revolution that overthrew the Pahlavi regime, four guerrilla organizations — the Feda'i, the pro-Tudeh Feda'i Munsh'eb, the Islamic Mujahedin and the Marxist Mujahedin — are said to have "delivered the regime its coup de grace," in the street fighting of February 9–11, 1979.

Background
According to Ervand Abrahamian, a scholar of the subject:

In terms of political background, the guerrillas can be divided into five groups:
the Sazaman-i Cherikha-yi Feda'i Khalq-i Iran (The Organization of the Iranian People's Guerrilla Freedom Fighters), known in short as the Marxist Feda'i;
the Sazman'i Mujahedin-i Khalq-i Iran [or the People's Mujahedin of Iran]; 
the Marxist offshoot from the Mujadedin, known as the Marxist Mujahedin or Peykar;
small Islamic groups on the whole limited to one locality: Gorueh-i Abu Zarr (Abu Zarr Group) in Nahavand, Gorueh-i Shi'iyan-i Rastin (True Shi'i Group) in Hamadan, Gorueh-i Allah Akbar (Allah Akbar Group) in Isfahan, and Goreueh-i al-Fajar (Al-Fajar Group) in Zahedan;
small Marxist groups. These included both independent groups, such as the Sazman-i Azadibakhshi-i Khalqha-yi Iran (Organization for the Liberation of the Iranian Peoples), Gorueh-i Luristan (Luridtan Group), and Sazman-i Arman-i Khalq (Organization for the People's Ideal); and cells belonging o political parties advocating armed struggle —the Tofan group, the Revolutionary Organization of the Tudeh party, the Kurdish Democratic party, and a new left organization named Grouh-i Ittehad-i Komunistha (Group of United communists). Moreover, some of the feda'is had at the time of their death joined the Tudeh party.

Guerrilla groups formed it is believed, because the non-armed, mass-based communist Tudeh Party was under such intense repression it was unable to function, while in the outside world guerillas Mao Zedong, General Võ Nguyên Giáp and Che Guevara were having, or had had, much success. The Iranian guerrilla strategy has been described by Abrahamian as "heroic deeds of violent resistance to break the spell of government terror".

 In a situation where there are no firm links between the revolutionary intelligentsia and the masses, we are not like fish in water, but rather like isolated fish surrounded by threatening crocodiles. Terror, repression, and absence of democracy have made it impossible for us to create working-class organizations. To break the spell of our weakness and to inspire the people into action we must resort to revolutionary armed struggle...

The background of the guerrillas was overwhelming educated middle class. From 1971 to 1977 an estimated 341 of them were killed, of whom over 90% of those for whom information could be found were intellectuals.

History
The event from which most historians mark the beginning of the guerrilla era in Iran was the February 8, 1971 attack on a gendarmerie post at Siahkal on the Caspian Sea. Guerillas killed three policemen and freed two previously arrested guerrillas.

The guerrilla organizations were quite active in the first half of the 1970s.  In the two and half years from mid 1973 through 1975, three United States colonels, a Persian general, a Persian sergeant, and a Persian translator of the United States Embassy were all assassinated by guerrilla groups. In January 1976 eleven persons sentenced to death for these killings.

By the second half of the 1970s, however, the groups were in decline, suffering from factionalism and government repression.

The People's Mujahedin of Iran (Sazman'i Mujahedin-i Khalq-i Iran) was in the middle of an internal debate over whether to continue armed struggle, and the group's own publications report few actions in 1978 and a `relative silence` as the number of actions decreased after June 1978. 
The Iranian People's Sacrificing Guerrillas (Cherik'ha-ye Feda'i-ye Khalq-e Iran), according to one of the group's leaders, `disintegrated and disappeared` after `the blows of 1976`, `set itself principally to protecting itself,` and engaged only in `scattered actions` to show that it still existed. Only a few dozen members remained at large. Ideologically, the group decided that objective conditions for revolution didn't exist, and as the Islamist movement escalated, the organization claimed credit for relatively few actions - one in the summer 1977, two in early 1978, and five in the summer of 1978, according to the group's pronouncements. At the end of the year, with membership presumably growing, the organization picked up its pace, claiming credit for a half-dozen actions in December 1978 and a dozen in January 1979.

Iranian Revolution
By late 1978 however, the massive demonstrations, return of oppositionists from abroad, and pressure on the monarchy's security forces from the revolutionary movement revived the groups. Guerilla groups became active "both in killing Iranian military and police leaders and participating in oppositional demonstrations ... in the course of 1978 ... the Fedaiyan and the Mojahedin were able to ... become sizable movements, largely of young people."

Groups

Democratic Party of Iranian Kurdistan
 Kurdistan Democratic Party

Komala Society of Revolutionary Toilers of Iranian Kurdistan
Komala Kurdistan's Organization of the Communist Party of Iran
 Socialist Faction of Komala
Komala Party of Iranian Kurdistan
Komala of the Toilers of Kurdistan
Komala Party of Iranian Kurdistan – Reunification Faction

Organization of Communist Revolutionaries (Marxist–Leninist)
Union of Iranian Communists (Sarbedaran)
 Communist Party of Iran (Marxist–Leninist–Maoist)

Organization of Iranian People's Fedai Guerrillas
Iranian People's Fedai Guerrillas
Organization of Iranian People's Fedaian (Majority)
 Organization of Iranian People's Fedai Guerrillas – Majority Left Wing
 Organization of Iranian People's Fedai Guerrillas (Minority)
Organization of Iranian People's Fedai Guerrillas – Followers of the Identity Platform
Organization of Iranian People's Fedai Guerrillas (1985)
 Fedaian Organisation (Minority)

People's Mujahedin of Iran
 Peykar

Islamic Nations PartyKurdistan Free Life PartyKurdistan Freedom PartyPeople's Democratic FrontUnion of Communist MilitantsWorker-communist Party of Iran – HekmatistWorker's Way

See also

List of guerrilla movements
Organizations of the Iranian Revolution

Sources
Iran Between Two Revolutions By Ervand Abrahamian, Princeton University Press, 1982
Mottahedeh, Roy, The Mantle of the Prophet : Religion and Politics in Iran, One World, Oxford, 1985, 2000

References and notes

External links 

 Cosroe Chaquèri collection of Iranian left-wing materials, 1960-1985 from Middle East Materials Project

Guerrilla organizations

Organisations of the Iranian Revolution
Socialism in Iran